Rodrick Almar Rutledge (born August 12, 1975) is a former professional American football player who played tight end for five seasons for the New England Patriots and Houston Texans of the National Football League (NFL). 

Rutledge was the first player to ever catch a pass from Tom Brady, a 6-yard reception on Thanksgiving Day 2000 against the Detroit Lions. Known more for his blocking than his pass catching, Rutledge was a key member of the 2001 Super Bowl champion Patriots.

References

1975 births
Living people
Alabama Crimson Tide football players
American football tight ends
Houston Texans players
New England Patriots players
Players of American football from Birmingham, Alabama
Tom Brady